Luis Fernández Álvarez (1 April 1853 – 24 May 1937) was a Spanish American physician and researcher who practiced in California and Hawaii.

Fernández was actually his principal surname (his father's surname), per Spanish naming customs. However, he is best known by his mother's surname, as in the English-speaking world the last name is the principal surname, although, again, this is contrary to Spanish naming customs. His American-born children and descendants took his last surname for that reason, as well, albeit without the diacritic.

Early life 
Álvarez was born in a small village called Mallecina, Salas, Asturias. His father was Eugenio Fernández, who was in charge of the business and palace affairs in Madrid of Infante Francisco de Paula of Spain, a Spanish royal prince and the youngest son of the former king Carlos IV. He was orphaned at an early age: his mother died when he was three, and he lost his father at the age of seven. When he was 13, one of his brothers took him to Havana where he secured a good education. He learned to speak English fluently. 

In 1878, he married Clementina Schutze and in 1887 graduated from Cooper Medical College (now Stanford University) with a medical degree. In Honolulu, he was asked by the government to stay and become a government physician. Álvarez quickly learned to speak the Hawaiian language.

Career 
In 1895, Álvarez resigned his position in Waialua to prepare himself for work as Superintendent of a new experimental hospital for the treatment of leprosy which was to be established in Kalihi, a suburb of Honolulu. In order to learn research bacteriology, Álvarez went — at his own expense — for six months of intensive study at Johns Hopkins University. 

On his return, he developed a method for the better diagnosis of macular leprosy. With a small mouse-tooth forceps he would lift up a little piece of skin, snip it off with scissors, grind it into a fluid in a small glass mortar, and then stain the fluid for Hansen's bacilli. This method or a modification of it has been used ever since. Álvarez developed a serum by injecting Hansen's bacilli into horses. He used this on a number of Hansen's disease patients with encouraging results. 

1853 births
1937 deaths
People from Oviedo (Asturian comarca)
American people of Asturian descent
Spanish emigrants to the United States
American hospital administrators
Stanford University alumni
American leprologists
20th-century American physicians
Deaths from pneumonia
Place of death missing
19th-century Spanish physicians
20th-century Spanish physicians
Physicians from Hawaii
Leper hospital administrators
Spanish people in Spanish Cuba